Tieba Traoré was a king of the Kénédougou Empire who reigned from 1876 until his death in 1893.  Son of the previous king, Mansa Douala, Traoré moved the Empire's capital to Sikasso, building a palace on the city's Mamelon hill.  Traoré fought a number of battles with both Mandinka conqueror Samory Touré and the rapidly advancing French colonial army, including a prolonged French siege of Sikasso from 1887 to 1888.  In 1890 Traoré constructed his celebrated tata (fortified wall) around Sikasso.  In the same year, he accompanied French Colonel Louis Archinard to witness the destruction of Ségou under French heavy artillery; nonetheless he continued to struggle to maintain Kénédougou's independence.  

Following his 1893 death, his brother Babemba Traoré assumed the throne.

External links
Notes on the Conquest of Western Sudan

1893 deaths
People of French West Africa
Malian royalty
19th-century monarchs in Africa
Year of birth missing
People from Sikasso
Kénédougou Kingdom